The Governor of Leningrad Oblast is the head of executive branch for the Leningrad Oblast, considered as Prime Minister of Leningrad Oblast.

The office of Governor is an elected position, for which elected officials serve four year terms. While individual politicians may serve as many terms as they can be elected to, Governors cannot be elected to more than two consecutive terms.

The official residence for the Governor is located in Saint Petersburg. The current Governor is Aleksandr Drozdenko, who assumed office on May 11, 2012.

List of office-holders

Chairmen of Executive Committee of Leningrad Oblast (1927–1991) 

 Nikolai Komarov / Fyodor Sobinov (1927-1930)
 Ivan Koatskiy (1930-1931)
 Fyodor Czarkov (1931—1932)
 Pyotr Strouppe (1932-1936)
 Alexey Grichmanov (1936-1937)
 Pyoter Tyurkin (1937)
 Anton Nikitin (1937)
 Nikolai Solovyov (1938-1946)
 Ilya Kharitonov (1946-1948)
 Ivan Dmitriev (1948-1950)
 Ivan Petrov (1950-1952)
 Vladimir Ponomaryov (1952-1954)
 Georgiy Vorobyov (1954-1957)
 Nikolay Smirnov (1957-1961)
 Grigoriy Kozlov (1961-1963, 1964-1968)
 Vasily Sominich (1963-1964) / Boris Popov (1963-1964)
Alexander Shibalov (1968-1980)
Ratmir Bobovikov (1980-1983)
Nikolai Popov (1983-1989)
Yury Yarov (1989-1991)

Elections
The latest election for the office was held on 13 September 2015

References 

 
Politics of Leningrad Oblast
Leningrad Oblast